Shchepnoye is a rural locality (a village) in Tugaysky Selsoviet, Blagoveshchensky District, Bashkortostan, Russia. The population was 9 as of 2010. There is 1 street.

Geography 
Shchepnoye is located 17 km southeast of Blagoveshchensk (the district's administrative centre) by road. Starye Turbasly is the nearest rural locality.

References 

Rural localities in Blagoveshchensky District